Teresa Pavlinek (born August 11, 1970) is a Canadian actress, writer, and television producer best known as the creator and star of The Jane Show.

Career
Pavlinek studied at McMaster University in Hamilton, Ontario, and became part of Second City Toronto after graduating.  She made guest appearances on The Sean Cullen Show, Royal Canadian Air Farce, Bless The Child, Improv Heaven and Hell, and Sue Thomas: F.B.Eye.  She starred in five seasons of the Gemini-nominated History Channel series, History Bites.

Her short plays include Dumplings and Death and Hot August Night, and her first full-length play, Made You Look, was written as a member of the Tarragon Theatre Playwrights Unit.

Teresa is part of the female comedy troupe Women Fully Clothed.

In 2016, Teresa appeared in a recurring role as Dana, a police medical examiner on the CBS crime/mystery series American Gothic.

References

External links

1970 births
Canadian television actresses
Canadian voice actresses
Canadian women comedians
Canadian women dramatists and playwrights
Living people
21st-century Canadian dramatists and playwrights
21st-century Canadian women writers